You Pay for the Whole Seat, but You'll Only Need the Edge is the second album released by the Norwegian rock group Animal Alpha. The track "Fire! Fire! Fire!" was used as a soundtrack in the game MotorStorm: Pacific Rift.

Track listing
All songs composed by Animal Alpha.

 "Pin You All" – 2:55
 "Master Of Disguise" – 3:34
 "Fire! Fire! Fire!" – 3:20
 "Alarm" – 4:10
 "Breed Again" – 4:12
 "In The Barn" – 5:40
 "Even When I'm Wrong, I'm Right" – 3:02
 "Tricky Threesome" – 4:09
 "Marilyn Love Doll" (bonus track) – 5:50

References

Animal Alpha albums
2008 albums